The Lion Man is a 1919 American action film serial released by the Universal Film Manufacturing Company, directed by Albert Russell and Jack Wells, produced by Russell and starring Kathleen O'Connor and Jack Perrin. The serial is now considered to be lost.

Cast
Kathleen O'Connor as Stella Donovan
 Jack Perrin as Jim Westcott
 Mack V. Wright as The Lion Man (in costume)
 J. Barney Sherry (credited Barney Sherry) as Frederick Cavendish/ The Lion Man (unmasked)
 Gertrude Astor as Celeste La Rue
 Henry A. Barrows as Enright
 C. Norman Hammond as Ching
 Robert Walker as John Cavendish
 Tom London (as Leonard Clapham)
 Slim Padgett
 William A. Carroll

Chapter titles
 Flames of Hate
 Rope of Death
 Kidnappers
 A Devilish Device
 In the Lion's Den
 House of Horrors
 Doomed
 Dungeon of Despair
 Sold into Slavery
 Perilous Plunge
 At the Mercy of Monsters
 Jaws of Destruction
 When Hell Broke Loose
 Desperate Deeds
 Furnace of Fury
 Relentless Renegades
 In Cruel Clutches
 In the Nick of Time

See also
 List of film serials
 List of film serials by studio
 Gertrude Astor filmography

References

External links

1919 films
Silent American drama films
American silent serial films
American black-and-white films
Universal Pictures film serials
Films directed by Albert Russell
1919 drama films
Lost American films
1919 lost films
Lost drama films
1910s American films